

Dinosaurs

Newly named dinosaurs

See also

References

1840s in paleontology
Paleontology